Caroline Boman Hansen (10 August 1860 – 5 January 1956) was a Swedisn–Norwegian hotelier.

She was born in Östervåla, Sweden, to Claes Erik Boman and Carin Persdotter. She married waiter, later hotelier, Hans Christian Marinius Hansen (1868–1915) in 1891. Hotel Continental and Theatercaféen in Kristiania (now Oslo) opened during 1900 and were originally owned by the Foss Brewery. Caroline and Christian Hansen took over the lease in 1909 and within three years they purchased the establishment.  The hotel's dining place, Theatercaféen, came to be one of the most popular in Kristiania, and a favourite among actors, writers and journalists.

Caroline Hansen ran the hotel for many years, first along with her husband, and later jointly  with her son Arne who died in 1954. His daughter Ellen Brochmann subsequently took over management. The hotel is owned and operated today by Caroline and Christian Hansen's descendants in the fourth generation.

References

External links
Hotel Continental, Oslo website
Theatercaféen website

1860 births
1956 deaths
People from Heby Municipality
Swedish emigrants to Norway
Naturalised citizens of Norway
Businesspeople from Oslo
Norwegian hoteliers
Women hoteliers